Myrna Jean McKay (born January 12, 1949, in Kerrobert, Saskatchewan; died May 30, 2018, in Crossfield, Alberta) was a Canadian curler.

McKay grew up in Red Deer Lake and Calgary, and later moved to Crossfield. In addition to her success in curling, she won a silver meda in fast-pitch as part of team Alberta at the 1969 Canada Summer Games.

Teams

References

External links
 
 Myrna McKay – Curling Canada Stats Archive

1949 births
2018 deaths
Canadian women curlers
Curlers from Saskatchewan
Canadian women's curling champions
Curlers from Calgary
Canadian softball players